Botyodes is a genus of moths of the family Crambidae.

Species
Botyodes andrinalis Viette, 1958
Botyodes asialis Guenée, 1854
Botyodes borneensis Munroe, 1960
Botyodes brachytorna Hampson, 1912
Botyodes crocopteralis Hampson, 1899
Botyodes diniasalis (Walker, 1859)
Botyodes fraterna Moore, 1888
Botyodes fulviterminalis Hampson, 1898
Botyodes principalis Leech, 1889
Botyodes rufalis Hampson, 1896

Former species
Botyodes flavibasalis Moore, 1867
Botyodes inconspicua Moore, 1888

References

Spilomelinae
Crambidae genera
Taxa named by Achille Guenée